Empire Stadium was a multi-purpose stadium that stood at the Pacific National Exhibition site at Hastings Park in Vancouver, British Columbia, Canada. Track and field and Canadian football, as well as soccer, rugby and musical events, were held at the stadium. The stadium was originally constructed for the 1954 British Empire and Commonwealth Games. The stadium (which sat 32,375 upon opening, but 30,229 after 1974) hosted both Elvis Presley and The Beatles. It saw most of its use as the home of the BC Lions of the CFL from 1954 to 1982, in which the venue also played host to the first Grey Cup game held west of Ontario in 1955. Empire Stadium also hosted the Grey Cup game in 1958, 1960, 1963, 1966, 1971, and 1974; seven times in total.

Empire Stadium was often home to the Shrine Bowl Provincial Championship for provincial senior high school.

The stadium was also home to the Vancouver Whitecaps of the North American Soccer League during the 1970s and early 1980s, as well as the Vancouver Royals of the same league for their only year of play in 1968.

Just before the 1966 Grey Cup game, the stadium had the new "gooseneck" or "slingshot" goal posts erected invented by Jim Trimble and Joel Rottman, marking the first time these goalposts were used at any level of football in a championship game. They were first used a week earlier at Montreal's Autostade for the 1966 Eastern Conference final; this model goalpost would soon become the standard design in the NFL and CFL. In 1970, it became the first facility in Canada to have artificial playing surface installed made by 3M, under the brand name "Tartan Turf".

Both the Lions and Whitecaps moved to BC Place Stadium for the 1983 season. The stadium was demolished in the early 1990s. The site served as a parking lot for the neighbouring Pacific National Exhibition as well as Playland for many years before being converted to a soccer field and track on the site of the old field.

With BC Place Stadium undergoing renovations in 2010 and 2011, the BC Lions and Vancouver Whitecaps played their home games at Empire Field, a temporary field constructed on the former grounds of Empire Stadium.  After the renovations to BC Place were complete, the temporary stadium was removed.  The park and sports fields were restored for community use.

The Miracle Mile
Vancouver hosted the 1954 British Empire and Commonwealth Games in 1954 at Empire Stadium. The most famous event of the games was the One Mile Race in which both John Landy and Roger Bannister ran the distance in under four minutes. The race's end is memorialized in a statue of the two (with Landy glancing over his shoulder, thus losing the race), that stood outside the stadium until its demolition. The statue formerly stood near the south end of Hastings St., but has since been moved to the Pacific National Exhibition north entrance just metres from where the feat took place at the new Empire Fields.

See also

List of Commonwealth Games venues

References

External links
 Empire Stadium

1954 establishments in British Columbia
1993 disestablishments in British Columbia
Buildings and structures in Vancouver
Canadian Football League venues
Defunct soccer venues in Canada
Defunct athletics (track and field) venues
Defunct Canadian football venues
Defunct sports venues in Canada
Demolished buildings and structures in British Columbia
Hastings Park
History of Vancouver
Soccer venues in British Columbia
Sports venues completed in 1954
Sports venues demolished in 1993
Sports venues in Vancouver
Stadiums of the Commonwealth Games
Demolished sports venues

North American Soccer League (1968–1984) stadiums
Canadian football venues in British Columbia